= North Fall =

- Origin: Copenhagen, Denmark
- Genres: Indie rock
- Years active: 2012–present
- Labels: Voices Music and Entertainment
- Members: Anders Nikolai Belling; Kevin Hansen; David Nedergaard; Mikkel Moseholm

North Fall is a Danish lo fi indie rock project founded by singer/songwriter and producer Anders Belling. It consists of Belling and a group of collaborators all based in Copenhagen, Denmark.

In 2014 North Fall released their debut album 'Outside It's Growing Light" to a 5/6 review in Denmark's biggest music magazine GAFFA.
